Michael Steed is a British psephologist, political scientist, broadcaster, activist and Liberal Democrat politician. He was born in 1940 in Kent, where his father was a farmer. He has written extensively on political parties and elections.

Education and early life
He was educated at St. Lawrence College, Ramsgate, and at Corpus Christi College, Cambridge. In 1960, the South African authorities refused him entry to Sharpeville to deliver food aid to victims of the Sharpeville shootings.

From 1963 to 1965, Steed undertook postgraduate research at Nuffield College, Oxford, under Dr. David Butler. At the same time he was active in the Young Liberals, particularly on the issue of apartheid in South Africa. He became national Vice-Chairman of the Young Liberals.

Career
In 1966, Steed became Lecturer in Government at Manchester University, a post he held for many years until taking early retirement through ill health. As a psephologist, he became a specialist in the detailed analysis of election results from a sociological point of view, for many years providing media such as The Observer and The Economist with texts making such complexities as "percentage swing" accessible to the lay reader. In the late-1960s and throughout the 1970s, he made regular television appearances on "election night" programmes, often at the side of Bob McKenzie who popularised the "swingometer" based on the concept of swing devised by David Butler. Steed was to develop a more complex formula for calculating swing, sometimes known among psephologists as "Steed swing" to differentiate it from "Butler swing".

From 1964 to 2005, Steed, latterly in conjunction with Professor John Curtice, was responsible for the statistical analysis in David Butler's regular Nuffield election studies entitled "The British General Election of ....".

Political activity and views
Steed was a leading member of the "radical" wing of the Liberal Party which in the late-1960s and 1970s found itself at odds with the parliamentary party and then-leader Jeremy Thorpe over a number of issues. In particular, Steed and his colleagues felt that "the party must shift attention away from personalities to a wide-ranging debate about ideology, principles and policies". He contributed several articles to the radical monthly, New Outlook. For a time, he was an elected member of the Liberal Party's national executive.

Michael Steed has always been an ardent pro-European, and his study of parties and elections soon came to embrace continental as well as UK politics. In 1969, he called for a common European currency.

At the 1971 Liberal Assembly, he successfully moved the major pro-European resolution, noting however that the then-EEC, in which decisions were taken by "a secret cabal", must be made more democratic. National sovereignty, he argued, would "die away as a European democracy of widely diffused power was created and exercised at all levels" in "a close political union of the people of Europe".

Steed consistently called for wide-ranging constitutional reform, including devolution all round, with elected regional governments, a more proportional election system, and the abolition of a Prime Minister's right to dissolve Parliament on a whim. This last objective was finally achieved by the Fixed-term Parliaments Act 2011, only for it to be repealed by the Dissolution and Calling of Parliament Act 2022.

He stood as the Liberal Party candidate at the 1967 Brierley Hill by-election and the 1973 Manchester Exchange by-election, in which he pushed the Conservatives into third place. At the 1970 general election, he was the party's candidate for Truro. For the February 1974 general election, he stood at Manchester Central, where the Conservative candidate Christopher Horne pushed him into third place. In the 1979 European elections, he was the Liberal candidate for Greater Manchester North, where he was defeated by veteran Labour politician Barbara Castle. At the 1983 general election, he was the Liberal Party candidate for Burnley.

In 1976, Steed designed the new system for the election of the Leader of the Liberal Party.

Steed was elected President of the Liberal Party 1978–79.

For many years, he was a leading light in the Campaign for Homosexual Equality, serving on its executive committee and for a time as its treasurer. During a period of time when there was still great hostility to gay rights, he spoke out at public meetings, including an acrimonious one in Burnley in 1971 over the proposed establishment of a gay club, at which he shared the platform with Ray Gosling. This meeting has come to be seen as a watershed in the emergence of a national grassroots gay rights movement in Britain.

In 1975, with his former CHE colleague Paul Temperton, he founded Northern Democrat, a magazine calling for democratic regional government. This later developed into the Campaign for the North, an all-party group pressing for devolution for the English regions; as well as Scotland and Wales, with Steed as chairman and Temperton as director, using funding from the Rowntree Trust.

Retirement
In his retirement, Steed has returned to his native East Kent, where he remains active in local Liberal Democrat politics. In July 2008, he was elected to Canterbury City Council.

He is currently Honorary Lecturer in Politics and International Relations at the University of Kent. He has also been Senior Research Fellow of the Federal Trust.
He is a trustee of the Canterbury Commemoration Society, and a Vice-President of the Electoral Reform Society, and was a Trustee of the Arthur McDougall Fund until 2017.

In 2012, Michael Steed was elected to the Council of the Social Liberal Forum.

Publications

References

Academics of the University of Manchester
Alumni of Corpus Christi College, Cambridge
British political scientists
Councillors in Kent
Liberal Democrats (UK) councillors
Liberal Party (UK) parliamentary candidates
Gay politicians
English LGBT rights activists
People educated at St Lawrence College, Ramsgate
Presidents of the Liberal Party (UK)
1940 births
Living people
Psephologists
Voting theorists
English LGBT politicians
Alumni of Nuffield College, Oxford